The Law Forbids is a 1924 American drama film directed by Jess Robbins and written by Lois Zellner and Ford Beebe. The film stars Baby Peggy, Robert Ellis, Elinor Fair, Winifred Bryson, James Corrigan, and Anna Dodge. The film was released on April 7, 1924, by Universal Pictures.

Plot
As described in a film magazine review, playwright Paul Remsen and his wife Rhoda separate. Rhoda takes their daughter Peggy with her to live in the country, where Peggy has a pet rooster named Alexander. Peggy makes her way to New York City in search of her father. He has become entangled with a vamp actress Inez Lamont, who is in a new play he has written. The child wanders first backstage and then onto the stage on the opening night of the production. Through her a reconciliation occurs between the parents.

Cast          

A Universal Pictures publication showing the cast for the film includes Robert Bolder, Merta Sterling, and Vola Vale, who may all have had uncredited roles, possibly in the stage production.

Preservation
An incomplete copy of The Law Forbids is held in a film collection in the Netherlands.

References

External links

Lobby card at www.alamy.com

1924 films
1920s English-language films
Silent American drama films
1924 drama films
Universal Pictures films
Films directed by Jess Robbins
American silent feature films
American black-and-white films
1920s American films